Anacithara undaticosta is a species of sea snail, a marine gastropod mollusc in the family Horaiclavidae.

In 1994 R.N. Kilburn disputed the attribution by Charles Hedley (1922) of Pleurotoma undaticostata  Reeve, 1845 to the genus Anacithara, because the original figure by Reeve showed a shell that is too fusiform, and lacked further detail. The holotype of this species as described by Reeve is lost, making it impossible to describe this species accurately.

Description
The length of the shell attains 9.5 mm.

The whitish shell has a fusiform shape. The, whorls are slightly shouldered, with longitudinal, waved ribs.

Distribution
This marine species is endemic to Australia and occurs off Queensland.

References

 Reeve, L.A. 1845. Monograph of the genus Pleurotoma. pls 20–33 in Reeve, L.A. (ed). Conchologia Iconica. London : L. Reeve & Co. Vol. 1.
 Brazier, Proc. Linn. Soc. N.S.W., i., 1876, p. 161

External links
  Tucker, J.K. 2004 Catalog of recent and fossil turrids (Mollusca: Gastropoda). Zootaxa 682:1-1295.

undaticosta
Gastropods described in 1845